Jakab Cseszneky de Csesznek et Visk was a Hungarian aristocrat and first Lord of Csesznek in the 13th century.

Jakab was the son of Mihály, member of the clan Bána, and equerry of Andrew II of Hungary.

He became the swordbearer of the King Béla IV and held also the title Count of Trencsén. About 1263 he constructed the famous gothic Castle of Csesznek in the Bakony mountains. Jakab Cseszneky and his descendants have been called after the castle: Cseszneky.

His wife was the daughter of Mark I, member of the clan Csák. His sons, Miklós, Lőrinc, Szomor and Mihály were important supporters of the Kings Ladislaus IV of Hungary and Charles I of Hungary and fought bravely against Máté Csák III, the powerful Hungarian feudal lord.

Sources

 Györffy György: Az Árpád-kori Magyarország történeti földrajza
 The castle of Csesznek
 Szilágyi Sándor: A Magyar Nemzet Története

Hungarian nobility
Jakab
13th-century Hungarian people
Masters of the cupbearers